The Islamic Financial Services Act 2013, is a Malaysian law which enacted to provide for the regulation and supervision of Islamic financial institutions, payment systems and other relevant entities and the oversight of the Islamic money market and Islamic foreign exchange market to promote financial stability and compliance with Shariah and for related, consequential or incidental matters.

Structure
The Islamic Financial Services Act 2013, in its current form (22 March 2013), consists of 18 Parts containing 291 sections and 16 schedules (including no amendment).
 Part I: Preliminary
 Part II: Regulatory Objectives and Powers and Functions of Bank
 Part III: Authorization
 Part IV: Shariah Requirements
 Part V: Payment Systems
 Part VI: Prudential Requirements
 Part VII: Ownership, Control and Transfer of Business
 Part VIII: Financial Groups
 Part IX: Business Conduct and Consumer Protection
 Part X: Islamic Money Market and Islamic Foreign Exchange Market
 Part XI: Submission of Document or Information
 Part XII: Examination
 Part XIII: Directions of Compliance
 Part XIV: Intervention and Remedial Action
 Part XV: Other Powers of Bank
 Part XVI: Enforcement and Penalties
 Part XVII: General Provisions
 Part XVIII: Repeal, Savings and Transitional
 Schedules

References

External links
 Islamic Financial Services Act 2013 

2013 in Malaysian law
Malaysian federal legislation